Ismail Semed was an Uighur activist executed by China for possession of illegal firearms and explosives.  He was accused of "attempting to split the motherland".

A Chinese court found Semed guilty of possession of illegal firearms and explosives and separatism for involvement in the East Turkestan Islamic Movement, which is considered a terrorist group by China and other countries including the United States. He was executed by firing squad on 8 February 2007 in Urumqi.

Human rights group said the evidence was insufficient. Nicholas Bequelin, Hong Kong-based China researcher of Human Rights Watch, said:"The death penalty was widely disproportionate to the alleged crimes ... his trial did not meet minimum requirements of fairness and due process."

References

Year of birth missing
2007 deaths
Chinese Islamists
Executed People's Republic of China people
21st-century executions by China
People executed by China by firing squad
Uyghur activists